Edinburgh Park railway station is a railway station in the west of Edinburgh, Scotland, serving the Edinburgh Park business park and the Hermiston Gait shopping centre. The new station building was designed by IDP Architects, and it opened on 4 December 2003. Ticket barriers came into use on 25 March 2015.

There are two platforms, linked by a covered footbridge, which is accessible by either stairs or a lift. There is also a pedestrian underpass just outside the station, accessible from both platforms. Tickets are available from one of the two ticket machines.

The railway through Edinburgh Park station was electrified (using overhead wires at 25 kV AC) in October 2010 as part of the Airdrie-Bathgate Rail Link project.

Edinburgh Trams

The Edinburgh Park tram stop (and the entire tram line) opened on 31 May 2014, the station then becoming a fully staffed rail/tram interchange. The tram stop is adjacent to the southern exit of the railway station.

The first tram (under test and without passengers) called at the stop on 8 October 2013.

Services 
The Milngavie and Glasgow Queen Street via Falkirk Grahamston do not run in the evenings or on Sundays, while the Dunblane services are hourly on a Sunday.

Trains on the E&GR main line to Queen Street H.L via  do not stop here and passengers wishing to travel to stations between Falkirk & Queen St H.L must change at Polmont during evenings and Sundays.

References 

Railway stations in Edinburgh
Railway stations opened by Network Rail
Railway stations in Great Britain opened in 2003
Railway stations served by ScotRail
Edinburgh Trams stops
IDP Architects railway stations